Valanida is a village and a community of the Elassona municipality. Before the 2011 local government reform it was part of the municipality of Elassona, of which it was a municipal district. The 2011 census recorded 450 inhabitants in the village and 559 in the community. The community of Valanida covers an area of 58.354 km2.

History
The settlement is recorded as village and as "Valanida" in the Ottoman Tahrir Defter number 101 dating to 1521.

Administrative division
The community of Valanida consists of two separate settlements: 
Kleisoura 
Valanida

Population
According to the 2011 census, the population of the settlement of Valanida was 450 people, a decrease of almost 30% compared to that of the previous census of 2001.

See also
 List of settlements in the Larissa regional unit

References

Populated places in Larissa (regional unit)